Philip H. Rose (born February 26, 1946) is a Republican politician who formerly served as member of the Ohio House of Representatives, serving the 87th District in 2012.

References

1946 births
Living people
Republican Party members of the Ohio House of Representatives
21st-century American politicians
People from McArthur, Ohio
People from Hamden, Ohio